Piotr Wala (16 December 1936 – 22 October 2013) was a Polish ski jumper. He competed in the normal hill and large hill events at the 1964 Winter Olympics.

References

1936 births
2013 deaths
Polish male ski jumpers
Olympic ski jumpers of Poland
Ski jumpers at the 1964 Winter Olympics
People from Bielsko County